Capitanejo may refer to:

 Capitanejo, Juana Díaz, Puerto Rico, a barrio
 Capitanejo, Ponce, Puerto Rico, a barrio
 Capitanejo, Santander, a municipality in Santander, Colombia
 Capitanejo,(Argentina), Specially south of Argentina, an indigene commanding a small group of tribe members